Tekhelet ( təḵēleṯ; alternate spellings include tekheleth, t'chelet, techelet and techeiles) is a "blue-violet", "blue", or "turquoise" dye highly prized by ancient Mediterranean civilizations. In the Hebrew Bible and Jewish tradition, it was used in the clothing of the High Priest, the tapestries in the Tabernacle, and the tzitzit (fringes) affixed to the corners of one's four-cornered garments, including the tallit. Tekhelet is most notably mentioned in the third paragraph of the Shema, quoting .

Neither the source nor method of production of tekhelet is specified in the Bible. According to later rabbinic sources, it was produced exclusively from a marine creature known as the Ḥillazon. Knowledge of how to produce tekhelet was lost in medieval times, and since then tzitzit did not include tekhelet. However, in modern times, many Jews believe that experts have identified the Ḥillazon and rediscovered the tekhelet manufacture process, and now wear tzitzit which include the resulting blue dye. The creature most commonly thought to have produced authentic tekhelet is the snail Hexaplex trunculus (historically known as Murex trunculus).

A garment with tzitzit has four tassels, each containing four strings. There are three opinions in rabbinic literature as to how many of the four strings should be dyed with tekhelet: two strings; one string; or one-half string.

Biblical references 

Of the 49 or 48 uses in the Masoretic Text, one refers to fringes on cornered garments of the whole nation of Israel, 42 refer to the priesthood or temple clothes and garments. The remaining 6 in Esther, Jeremiah and Ezekiel are secular uses; such as when Mordechai puts on "blue and white" "royal clothing" in Esther. The color could be used in combination with other colors such as 2 Chronicles  where the veil of Solomon's Temple is made of blue-violet (Tekhelet), purple (Hebrew: אַרְגָּמָן Argaman) and scarlet (Biblical Hebrew: שָׁנִי (Shani) or כַּרְמִיל karmiyl).  states that tekhelet-cloth could be obtained from "isles of Elishah" (likely Cyprus). All Biblical mentions of tekhelet (both secular and priestly) attribute its usage to some kind of elite. This implies that tekhelet was difficult to obtain and expensive, an impression further corroborated by the later rabbinic writings.

History 

The manufacture of tekhelet appears to date back to at least 1750 BCE in Crete. In the Amarna letters (14th century BCE) tekhelet garments are listed as a precious good used for a royal dowry.

At some point following the Roman destruction of the Second Temple, the identity of the source of the dye was lost, and since then Jews have only worn tzitzit without tekhelet. The Talmud mentions use of tekhelet in the period of Rav Ahai (5th-6th century); however the Tanhuma (8th century) laments that tekhelet has been lost. 

This loss appears to have been caused by a progression of historical events. Already in the first century, Caesar and Augustus restricted the use of the Murex dye to the governing class. Nero made laws that stated no one was allowed to wear purple because it was the color of royalty, and specifically he forbade goods dyed with Purpura (the name used for the Murex trunculus) under penalty of death. The idea that it was illegal to wear tekhelet is corroborated by a Talmudic story, in which rabbis caught smuggling tekhelet were liable to the death penalty. In the sixth century, Justinian put the tekhelet and argaman industries under a royal monopoly, causing independent dyers to cease their work and find other employment. The apparent final straw was the Muslim conquest of 639, in which the royal Byzantine dying industry was destroyed. Developments in the Jewish community may also have played a role, such as the proliferation of counterfeit (indigo) threads which made the procurement of genuine tekhelet difficult, and the persecution of Byzantine Jews which interfered with their export of tekhelet to Babylonia. Some have argued that the use of tekhelet persisted (at least in certain locations) for several centuries beyond the Muslim conquest, based on texts from the geonim and early rishonim which discuss the commandment in practical terms.

The reason why royalty used the Murex dye as opposed to indigo which looked the same was because indigo faded. However once they figured out how to make indigo endure they stopped using the Murex trunculus because indigo was much cheaper. That time is when people stopped using the Murex trunculus for its Dye entirely.

Identifying the color of tekhelet 
Despite the general agreement of the most of the modern English translations of the phrase, the term tekhelet itself presents several basic problems. 

First, it remains unclear to what extent the word in biblical times denoted a color or a source material, though it appears that at least in contemporary Mesopotamian sources, the cognate word takiltu referred to a color and not a material or dying process.

Second, although with time tekhelet came to denote the color blue, the exact hue in antiquity is not definitively known. The task is made harder by the tendency of ancient writers to identify colors not so much by their hue, as by other factors such as luminosity, saturation and texture. Modern scholars believe that tekhelet probably referred to blue-purple and blue colors. The color of tekhelet was likely to have varied in practice, as ancient dyers were generally unable to reproduce exact colors from one batch of dye to another.

Sources

In the early classical sources (Septuagint, Aquila, Symmachus, Vulgate, Philo, and Josephus), tekhelet was translated into Greek as hyakinthos ("hyacinth") or the Latin equivalent. The color of the hyacinth flower ranges from violet blue to a bluish purple (though the hyacinth species dominant in the eastern Mediterranean - Hyacinthus orientalis - is violet), and the word hyakinthos was used to describe both blue and purple colors.

Early rabbinic sources provide indications as to the nature of the color. Some sources describe tekhelet as visually indistinguishable from indigo (kala ilan). This description is also somewhat ambiguous, as different varieties of indigo have colors ranging between blue and purple, but generally the color of dyed indigo in the ancient world was blue.

Other rabbinic sources describe tekhelet as similar to the sea or sky. An oft-repeated explanation for the Torah's choice of tekhelet went as follows: "Why is tekhelet different from all other colors? Because tekhelet is similar [in appearance] to the sea, and the sea is similar to the sky, and the sky is similar to lapis lazuli, and lapis lazuli is similar to the Throne of Glory." (In a few versions of this source, "plants" (asavim) are included in this chain of similarity even though plants are not blue; though it has been suggested that these sources refer to bluish plants like hyacinth.) Jose ben Jose was another early author who described tekhelet as resembling the sky.

In still other sources the color of tekhelet is compared to the night sky. Similarly, Rashi quotes Moshe ha-Darshan who describes it as "the color of the sky as it darkens toward evening" - a deep blue or dark violet.

Rashi himself describes the color as "green" (ירוק) and "green, and close to the color of leeks", the latter commenting on a Talmudic passage according to which the morning Shema may be recited once it is light enough to distinguish between tekhelet and leeks. Other Jewish texts comment that "the appearance which is called in the language of Ashkenaz bleu (בלו"א) is within the category of green (ירוק)" suggesting that Rashi's language does not necessarily rule out a blue color.

In Akkadian, the cognate word takiltu is written using the word sign also used for lapis lazuli, suggesting they have similar colors. Lapis lazuli can vary between blue and purple-blue, and according to some sources the preferred shade of lapis lazuli in the Near East was purple-blue. However, Mesopotamian mythology asserted that visible sky is a layer of lapis lazuli stone underlying Heaven, suggesting a sky-blue color for the stone.

The Sifrei says that counterfeit tekhelet was made from both "[red] dye and indigo", indicating that the overall color was purple. However, other sources list just "indigo" as the counterfeit, suggesting either that in their opinion the color was purely blue, or that indigo was the main counterfeit ingredient and the other ingredients not significant enough to mention.

The Sippar Dye Text (7th century BCE), as well as the Leyden and Stockholm papyri (3rd century) provide recipes for counterfeit takiltu dye that include a mixture of red and blue colors, for an overall purple color.

A pure blue color can only be produced from Hexaplex dye through a debromination process. Only in the 1980s did modern scientists learn how to create blue Hexaplex dye using this process, leading some experts to declare that ancient dyers would not have been able to create blue tekhelet (and therefore, that an undebrominated purple color is more likely). However, in recent years archaeologists have recovered several fabrics dyed blue with Hexaplex dye 1800 or more years ago, demonstrating that ancient dyers could and did make blue dye from Hexaplex. Such fabrics have been found at Wadi Murabba'at (2nd century), Masada (1st century BCE), Qatna (14th century BCE), and arguably Pazyryk valley (5th-4th century BCE).

Identifying the ḥillazon 
While the Bible does not identify the source of tekhelet, rabbinic halakha specified that it could only be made from a sea creature known as the ḥillazon.

Rabbinic sources describe various qualities of this creature. It was found on the coast between Tyre and Haifa. "Its body is similar to the sea, and its form (ברייתו) is similar to a fish, and it comes up [from the sea] once every 70 years, and with its blood tekhelet is dyed, therefore it is expensive." Dye was extracted from the Ḥillazon by cracking it open, suggesting that it has a hard external shell. Just as the Hebrews' clothing did not wear out in the desert, the shell of the Ḥillazon does not wear out. Garments tied with tekhelet and indigo have such similar appearance that only God can distinguish them. Elsewhere, one opinion says that there is no chemical test which can distinguish between tekhelet and indigo wool, but another opinion describes such a test and tells the story of it working successfully. Trapping the Ḥillazon is considered a violation of Shabbat. In the time of the Talmud the hilazon was used as part of a remedy for hemorrhoids, though this may refer to a different species of snail.

Various animals have been suggested as the ḥillazon.

Bonellia Viridis  

See the following link for more info.Chilazon

Hexaplex trunculus 

In his doctoral thesis (London, 1913) on the subject, Rabbi Yitzhak HaLevi Herzog named Hexaplex trunculus (then known by the name "Murex trunculus") as the most likely candidate for the dye's source. Herzog concluded “it is very unlikely that the tekhelet-hillazon is not the snail called murex trunculus, but though unlikely, it is still possible.” Though Hexaplex trunculus fulfilled many of the Talmudic criteria, Herzog's inability to consistently obtain blue dye (sometimes the dye was purple) from the snail precluded him from declaring it to be the dye source. In the 1980s, Otto Elsner, a chemist from the Shenkar College of Fibers in Israel, discovered that if a solution of the dye was exposed to ultraviolet rays, such as from sunlight, blue instead of purple was consistently produced. In 1988, Rabbi Eliyahu Tavger dyed Tekhelet from H. trunculus for the Mitzvah (commandment) of Tzitzit for the first time in recent history. Based on this work, four years later, the Ptil Tekhelet Organization was founded to educate about the dye production process, and to make the dye available for all who desire to use it. The television show The Naked Archaeologist interviews an Israeli scientist who also makes the claim that this mollusk is the correct animal. A demonstration of the production of the blue dye using sunlight to produce the blue color is shown. The dye is extracted from the hypobranchial gland of Hexaplex trunculus snails.

Chemically, exposure to sunlight turns the red 6,6'-dibromoindigo in snails into a mixture of blue indigo dye and blue-purple 6-bromoindigo. The leuco (white) solution form of dibromoindigo loses some bromines in the ultraviolet radiation.

Arguments for Hexaplex Trunculus 
The dye produced by Hexaplex has the exact same chemical composition as indigo, corresponding to the statement that only God can distinguish the tekhelet from indigo garments.

In the area between Tyre and Haifa where the hilazon was found, piles of murex shells hundreds of yards long have been found, apparently the result of dying operations. In Tel Shikmona (near Haifa), a "biblical era purple dye workshop" was found including relics of purple dye produced from sea snails, as well as textile manufacturing equipment. 

Hexaplex has a hard external shell, as the hilazon appears to.

The word Ḥillazon is cognate to the Arabic word halazuun, meaning snail. Hexaplex opponents suggest that in ancient times the word might have referred to a broader category of animals, perhaps including other candidate species such as the cuttlefish.

Another requirement according to the Talmud is that the dye cannot fade, and the Murex dye does not fade and can only be removed from wool with bleach.

The Talmud states that the hillazon is preferably kept alive while the dye is extracted, as killing it causes the dye to degrade. This matches both ancient descriptions of the Hexaplex dying process, and also modern experience that an enzyme in the snail needed for dye production decays quickly after death.

The Jerusalem Talmud translates tekhelet as porporin; similarly Musaf Aruch translates tekhelet as parpar. These translations refer to the Latin term purpura, meaning the dye produced by Hexaplex snails. Similarly, Yair Bacharach stated that tekhelet was derived from purpura snails, even though this forced him to conclude that the color of tekhelet was purple rather than blue, as in his era it was unknown how to produce blue dye from Hexaplex.

The word porforin, or porpora, or porphoros is used in the midrash as well as many other Jewish texts to refer to the Ḥillazon, and this is the Greek translation of Murex trunculus. Pliny and Aristotle also both refer to the Porpura as being the source for purple and blue dyes, showing that the Murex has a long history of being used for blue dye.

 speaks of treasures hidden in the sand; the Talmud states that the word "treasures" refers to the Ḥillazon. Similarly, Hexaplex trunculus often burrows into the sand, making it difficult to detect even by scuba divers.

While (as described in the next section) Hexaplex arguably does not fit every textual description of the hillazon, nevertheless "Of the thousands of fish and mollusks that were studied to date, no other fish has been found that can produce the tekhelet color" which suggests that there is no more likely alternative species.

Arguments against Hexaplex Trunculus 
The Talmud equates the colors of tekhelet and indigo, but also gives a practical test to distinguish between the two fabrics. Seemingly, since the color-producing compounds in Hexaplex trunculus and indigo are identical, no test should be able to distinguish them. However, according to Professor Otto Elsner, while Hexaplex and indigo have the same color-producing compound, they also contain other compounds which differ and may lead to a different response in the practical test. According to Professor Ziderman, the test consists of a chemical reduction reaction occurring when hydrogen is produced by decaying organic matter. Indigo (from a vegetable source) is more strongly reduced than the debrominated indigo found in snail tekhelet (assuming a blue-purple rather than pure blue tekhelet), leading to a different result to the test.

The hillazon'''s body resembles the sea. This does not appear to be true of Hexaplex. Hexaplex supporters argue that when alive Hexaplex is well camouflaged and has a similar appearance to the sea floor, apparently due to algae which grow on its shell. This shell color can even be blue, similar to the sea.

The hillazon has a "form like a fish", which a snail seemingly does not. Hexaplex supporters reply that its shell somewhat resembles a fish in shape. Similarly Maimonides, Tosafot, and Rashi say the Ḥillazon is a "fish" (דג), while Hexaplex is a snail rather than a fish. Hexaplex supporters argue that many forms of aquatic life (e.g., shellfish — of which sea snails would be an example) are also called "דגים" in Hebrew. 

The hillazon is said to come up from the sea once every 70 years. It is unclear what this is exactly referring to, but the Hexaplex has no such cycle. Hexaplex supporters note that elsewhere the Talmud makes clear that the hillazon was also hunted by normal methods at other times. Some sources say the reference to "70 years" does not imply a periodic cycle, but rather simply that this phenomenon is a rare event. Hexaplex may have cycles of other lengths which inspired this statement: a seven-month cycle for harvesting Hexaplex was claimed by Pliny and confirmed by modern researchers, while Hexaplex appears to have a yearly behavioral cycle in which it burrows in the sand in summer and emerges to swim in winter. Other sources claim that the 70-year cycle was a miraculous occurrence which no longer occurs, or else that the decrease in Hexaplex population numbers may have caused this behavior to cease.

There are two other snails that produce the same dye as Hexaplex trunculus: Bolinus brandaris and Stramonita haemastoma, so how do we know which one is the Ḥillazon? Some argue that dye from any of these species would be valid. Alternatively: Hexaplex trunculus contains more natural indigo and thus is a more natural source for blue tekhelet, and archaeological finds show Hexaplex trunculus being processed separately from snails of the other species, suggesting that a different color was derived from this species.

Trapping the Ḥillazon is a violation of Shabbat. However, according to some rishonim, in general it is permitted to capture slow-moving animals like snails on Shabbat (as capturing them requires only a trivial effort - בחד שחיא). This contradiction suggests that the hillazon is not a snail. Hexaplex supporters argue that since Hexaplex tends to camouflage itself and hide in the sand, capturing it is a difficult process and thus (by some opinions) forbidden.

Rambam, describing the Ḥillazon, says that "its blood is as black as ink", which is not true of Hexaplex. Hexaplex supporters argue that this statement has no apparent source earlier than Rambam, and appears to be based on a mistaken statement by Aristotle. In any case, a black precipitate can in fact be derived from Hexaplex, which is then refined into dye.

Tractate Menachot and the Rambam explain the process for making the dye for tekhelet, and neither of them mention explicitly that it needs to be placed in the sunlight. Putting the dye in sunlight is a requirement to make the dye from the murex trunculus.

 Sepia officinalis 

In 1887, Grand Rabbi Gershon Henoch Leiner, the Radziner Rebbe, researched the subject and concluded that Sepia officinalis (common cuttlefish) met many of the criteria. Within a year, Radziner chassidim began wearing tzitzit with cuttlefish dye.  Herzog obtained a sample of this dye and had it chemically analyzed. The chemists concluded that it was a well-known synthetic dye "Prussian blue" made by reacting Iron(II) sulfate with an organic material. In this case, the cuttlefish only supplied the organic material which could have as easily been supplied from a vast array of organic sources (e. g., ox blood). Herzog thus rejected the cuttlefish as the Ḥillazon and some  suggest that had Leiner known this fact, he too would have rejected it based on his explicit criterion that the blue color must come from the animal and that all other additives are permitted solely to aid the color in adhering to the wool.

 Janthina 

Within his doctoral research on the subject of Tekhelet, Herzog placed great hopes on demonstrating that Hexaplex trunculus was the genuine Ḥillazon. However, having failed to consistently achieve blue dye from Hexaplex, he wrote: “If for the present all hope is to be abandoned of rediscovering the Ḥillazon Shel Tekhelet in some species of the genera Murex [now "Hexaplex"] and Purpura we could do worse than suggest Janthina as a not improbable identification". Janthina is a genus of sea snails, separate from Hexaplex. More recently, blue dye has been obtained from Hexaplex and the pigment molecule itself is hypothesized to be Tyrian Purple or Aplysioviolin. Janthina seems an unsuitable candidate in several ways: it was apparently only rarely used by ancient dyers; it is found far out at sea (while the hilazon is apparently found near the coast); and its pigment is allegedly unsuitable for dying.

In 2002 Dr. S. W. Kaplan of Rehovot, Israel, sought to investigate Herzog's suggestion that Tekhelet came from the extract of Janthina. After fifteen years of research he concluded that Janthina was not the ancient source of the blue dye.

 Current status of the tekhelet commandment 

A midrash states that tekhelet was "hidden" (נגנז) and now only white strings are available. According to the Sifrei, tekhelet is hidden until the next world. The meaning of the term "hidden" is unclear. Beit Halevi argued (when debating the Radziner rebbe) that a continuous tradition regarding the source of the dye, which no longer exists, was necessary in order for it to be used. However, Radbaz and Maharil ruled otherwise, that rediscovering the dye is sufficient to perform the commandment. Yeshuot Malko suggested that even if tekhelet was hidden until the messianic era, the apparent rediscovery of tekhelet suggests that the messianic era is approaching, rather than suggesting that the tekhelet is invalid.

According to halakha, when in doubt about the laws of a commandment from the Torah, one must act stringently. Some rabbis therefore argue that even if we are uncertain in our identification of the hilazon, we must wear the most likely dye anyway (i.e. Hexaplex). Others disagree, asserting that the principle of stringency only applies in cases such that after one acts stringently there is no further obligation (whereas if Hexaplex is only doubtfully correct, there would remain a theoretical obligation to find the actual correct species and use it).

Therefore, if a person acts differently from the rest of the Jewish people they are creating divisions. Some have argued that one should not publicly wear tekhelet for this reason; others consider this not to be a concern. In any case it would not be relevant in many contemporary communities where tekhelet-wearing is widespread.

There exists a Torah commandment (לא תגרע) not to detract from any other Torah law. Rabbi Hershel Schachter says that if one knows what tekhelet is yet chooses to wear tzizit without tekhelet, they are violating this commandment. Many other rabbis do not agree with this statement.

 Tying methods 
Maimonides holds that half of one string should be colored blue and it should wrap around the other seven white strings. It should wrap around three times and then leave some space and then three more and leave some more space and should continue like this for either 7 or 13 groups. The first and last wrap around should be from a white string not a blue string.

Raavad holds that one full string should be blue and there should be four groups of at least seven coils alternating between white and blue both beginning and ending with blue. There are multiple other opinions of how to tie the tzizit if one full string is blue.

Tosafot holds that two full strings should be tekhelet. He is of the opinion that the coils should be in groups of three, starting with three white, then three blue alternating and ending with three white. There is another way to tie using two full strings that Schachter follows based on the opinion of Shmuel Ben Hofni Gaon.

Tekhelet in Jewish culture

Besides the ritual uses of tekhelet, the color blue plays various roles in Jewish culture, some of which are influenced by the role of tekhelet.

The stripes on the tallit, often black or blue, are believed by some to symbolize the lost tekhelet, though other explanations have been given. The use of blue in the tallit and Temple robes led to the association of blue and white with Judaism and inspired the design of the flag of Israel.

Like their non-Jewish neighbors, Jews of the Middle East painted their doorposts, and other parts of their homes with blue dyes; have ornamented their children with tekhelet ribbons and markings; and have used this color in protective amulets. Tekhelet has been considered especially effective against the evil eye.

Gallery

See also

Tantura
Argaman, also called Tyrian purple, a Biblical reddish purple dye from the related seasnail, Bolinus brandaris.

Bibliography
 Gadi Sagiv, 'Deep Blue: Notes on the Jewish Snail Fight'
 
 
 KolRom Media, 'Techeiles - It's Not All Black and White'

References

External links
 Ptil Tekhelet – A group that promotes the view that the chilazon is the snail Murex trunculus''.
 Explanation of how tekhelet was discovered and made from the Murex trunculus

Jewish ritual objects
Hebrew words and phrases in the Hebrew Bible
Jewish religious clothing
Non-clerical religious clothing
Animal dyes
Shades of blue
Mollusc products
Color in religion